Woot (originally W00t) is an American Internet retailer based in the Dallas suburb of Carrollton, Texas. Founded by electronics wholesaler Matt Rutledge, it debuted on July 12, 2004.  Woot's main website generally offers only one discounted product each day, often a piece of computer hardware or an electronic gadget. Other Woot sites offer daily deals for T-shirts, wine, children's items, household goods; two other sites offer various items. On June 30, 2010, Woot announced an agreement to be acquired by Amazon.

Sales model 

Woot's tagline is "One Day, One Deal". Originally, Woot offered one product per day until its stock of that item was sold out, or until the product was replaced at midnight Central Time with the next offering. If a product sold out during its run, the next item would not appear until midnight, except during Woot-Off promotions.  However, post-acquisition from Amazon, if a product sells out fast enough (generally before Noon CT), a new product will be offered for sale.

Products are never announced beforehand. This sales model means that defective products cannot be replaced, only refunded. The company also does not provide customer support for the products it sells; in case of issues, customers are advised to seek support either from the manufacturer or through the online user community on the Woot forums.

Woot operates within the one-deal-a-day business model. Customers may buy up to three of the day items, although the site has occasionally limited product quantity to one per customer.

Woot does not reveal sales figures unless the item sells out or a new item is for sale. Except for the Shirt. woot, items are shipped only to the United States, using FedEx Ground, FedEx SmartPost, or United Parcel Service. All items, regardless of size or weight, are shipped for a flat fee.

Woot sometimes sells refurbished items.  In 2011, sales of 6,200 refurbished Motorola Xooms included a small number (about 100) that weren't refurbished properly and may have been sold with data from the devices' previous owners.

Marketing style 
Woot's main site previously featured a daily podcast by Matthew Shultz, that briefly described the item up for sale and included a humorous song or skit. This has since been replaced by a weekly video podcast.  Photoshop contests among Woot forum users for prizes, including cash, free shipping on Woot orders, and the Monkey Prize (typically a random monkey-related item of little or no value) were other promotional events.

Community members have contributed back to the site by offering Woot-related services. These include status checkers, Dashboard widgets, and Windows Sidebar widgets to report when the next product is listed; there are also webcasts and other methods to monitor the site's status.

Special events 
The site occasionally deviates from the one-product-per-day model for a "Woot-Off". A Woot-Off lasts for an unannounced length, usually 24–72 hours. During a Woot-Off, products usually sell out quickly, and when one product sells out, it is replaced within a minute or two by a new product. A percentage bar shows how much stock of the current product remains. However, Woot never gives the exact quantity available until after the item has sold out.

Beginning with the "gamma" launch of the Neuros MPEG 4 Recorder on February 9, 2005, Woot has occasionally partnered with another company to launch a new product with a one-day exclusive Woot sale.

Starting in August 2004, Woot began occasionally offering a blind grab bag officially called "Random Crap", in lieu of typical product sales.  While today its accompanying picture of a paper lunch bag with a question mark has kept its unofficial name "Bag of Crap", (BOC) it was originally dubbed "Bag of Crap" during the early years of the site when a physical bag of some kind (notebook, iomega zipper bags, etc.) was sold with the 1–3 "craps" and was part of what you were buying. Today, the BOC contains at least three "crappy" items and one bag whose value and quality are not guaranteed, but sometimes expensive items are included. The BOC has been known to sell out in a matter of hours. During the January 25, 2011 selling, the website received a record 3.1 million requests, and the product was sold out within eight seconds.

During April Fool's Day 2008, Woot staged a Woot-Off offering the same product repeatedly, except for a few brief periods when Woot sold Bags of Crap instead.  Three years later on April Fools' Day, Woot staged a "Bag of Crap" flash game, which users were instructed to play in order to win the privilege of buying Bags of Crap.

On April 1, 2011, eight thousand Bags of Crap were sold. Later in the day, once the Bag of Crap selling period was over, a Woot admin said that there were over seven million attempts to get the Bags of Crap.

Debuting on March 10, 2010, Woot ran limited one-hour versions of the Woot-Off called Happy Hour.  These events were promoted solely via Twitter, and did not appear on woot.com's front page.  Happy Hour didn't quite work out and was put on an indefinite hold by August 2011.

World of Wootcrap 
A special event was held on July 11, 2014 celebrating Woot.com's tenth birthday.

Acquisition 
On June 30, 2010, Woot was sold to Amazon for a reported sum of $110 million. The CEO, Matt Rutledge, sent an E-mail to employees stressing that Woot would continue to operate as per usual. However, in June 2014, he crowdsourced a new website called Meh to become the successor of Woot, citing dissatisfaction with changes made by Amazon.

Related sites 
Woot has created several spin-off sites, some following a similar business model as the main site, others providing other retail-related services. These include:

 Wine.woot 2006–2017
 Shirt.woot begun 2007
 Sellout.woot 2007 
 Kids.woot 2009–2017
 Deals.woot closed 2016
 Home.woot 2011–present
 Sport.woot 2012–present
 Electronics.woot launched 2012 as Tech.woot, renamed Electronics.woot in 2014
 Tools.woot 2013–present
 Accessories.woot 2013–2017
 Computers.woot 2014–present

See also 
 List of deal of the day services

References 
Citations

Notes

Bibliography
 Time magazine's "50 Coolest Websites 2005"
 PC Magazine site review
 Motley Fool article
 New York Times article
 National Public Radio All Things Considered interview with Woot writer Jason Toon and developer Luke Duff (Streaming Audio)

External links 
 Woot website

Internet forums
Online retailers of the United States
Companies based in Carrollton, Texas
Retail companies established in 2004
Amazon (company) acquisitions
2010 mergers and acquisitions
Deal of the day services